The 1936 Preston by-election was a parliamentary by-election held for the British House of Commons constituency of Preston on 25 November 1936.  The seat had become vacant when the Conservative Member of Parliament William Kirkpatrick had resigned to take up the post of representative to China of the Export Credits Guarantee Department.

The Conservative candidate, Edward Cobb, held the seat for his party.

See also
Preston (UK Parliament constituency)
Preston, Lancashire
1903 Preston by-election
1915 Preston by-election
1929 Preston by-election
1940 Preston by-election
1946 Preston by-election
2000 Preston by-election
List of United Kingdom by-elections

References 
 
 

By-elections to the Parliament of the United Kingdom in Lancashire constituencies
1936 elections in the United Kingdom
1936 in England
1930s in Lancashire
Elections in Preston